Maurice Euzennat (15 Novembre 1926 – 25 July 2004) was a French historian and archaeologist.

Career 
After he passed his agrégation in history and resided at the école française de Rome between 1951 and 1954, 
Maurice Euzennat made a part of his career in Morocco. Back in 1963, he created a French department of underwater archeology and activated the ship Archéonaute.

Maurice Euzennat worked on the history and civilization of ancient Rome, North Africa during Antiquity and also Gallia Narbonensis. He led excavations including one on the archaeological site of Volubilis. In addition, he conducted a study of Hanno's voyage.

Bibliography 
 Jean-Pierre Callu: Allocution à la mémoire de M. Maurice Euzennat, membre de l’Académie. In Comptes rendus des séances de l’Académie des Inscriptions et Belles-Lettres. 148. Jahrgang (2004), p. 1180
 Georges Souville: Maurice Euzennat (19262004). In: Antiquités Africaines. Volume 41–42 (2004–2005), p. 5.

External links 
 EUZENNAT Maurice, Joseph, Gaston on Académie des Inscriptions et Belles-Lettres
 Maurice Euzennat on BiblioMonde
 Biography
  Maurice Euzennat et le Maroc antique on Persée
 Bibliographie de Maurice Euzennat on Persée

1926 births
People from Seine-Maritime
2004 deaths
French archaeologists
French scholars of Roman history
Historians of antiquity
Members of the Académie des Inscriptions et Belles-Lettres
Chevaliers of the Ordre des Palmes Académiques
Officiers of the Légion d'honneur
20th-century archaeologists